A Chamber Woman (Danish: Kammerfrue; German: Kammerfrau; Swedish: Kammarfru) was a court office in several European courts. 

The Chamber Woman was in charge of the wardrobe, cosmetics and other matters concerning the domestic management of the personal chambers of a royal woman. She had about the equivalent task in the household of a royal woman as a personal Lady's maid, and assisted with dressing, undressing and bathing the royal woman. She supervised the chambermaids and the domestic concerns of the court of a royal woman, which was then performed by the servants. She was in rank between the ladies-in-waiting of the nobility and the domestic servants. In Sweden, the kammarfru was normally a woman not from the nobility, but from the wealthy burgher class.

Notable examples
 Ingrid Maria Wenner
 Anna Sofia Ramström

See also
 Woman of the Bedchamber, British equivalent
 Première femme de Chambre, French equivalent

References

 Klaus Kjølsen: Det Kongelige Danske Hof 1660-2000: en forvaltningshistorisk oversigt, 2010
 Fabian Persson (1999). Servants of Fortune. The Swedish court between 1598 and 1721. Lund: Wallin & Dalholm. 
 Rundquist, Angela, Blått blod och liljevita händer: en etnologisk studie av aristokratiska kvinnor 1850-1900, Carlsson, Diss. Stockholm : Univ.,Stockholm, 1989
 Hellsing, My (2013). Hovpolitik : Hedvig Elisabeth Charlotte som politisk aktör vid det gustavianska hovet. Örebro: Örebro universitet. Sid. 61. 

Court titles
Royal households
Danish courtiers
German courtiers
Swedish courtiers
Austrian courtiers
Austrian monarchy
Danish monarchy
Swedish monarchy
 Ch
Swedish court titles
Danish court titles